Alfred Osmani (born 20 February 1983, in Durres) is an Albanian retired football goalkeeper who lat played for Teuta in the Albanian First Division. He has previously played for Dinamo Tirana, KS Shkumbini Peqin, KS Besa Kavaje, KF Tirana and most recently KF Elbasani, all of these were in the Albanian Superliga.

Club career
KS Kamza is his first ever team in the Albanian First Division Osmani scored a stoppage-time equalising goal for Dinamo from the penalty spot in December 2011 against Bylis.

References

External links
 Profile – FSHF

1983 births
Living people
Footballers from Durrës
Albanian footballers
Association football goalkeepers
KF Teuta Durrës players
KS Shkumbini Peqin players
KF Tirana players
KF Elbasani players
FC Kamza players
Besa Kavajë players
FK Dinamo Tirana players
KS Kastrioti players
Kategoria Superiore players
Kategoria e Parë players